Acharna or Akharna was a town of ancient Crete. It appears in ancient Greek epigraphy.

Its site is located at Arkhanes (Modern Greek: Αρχάνες).

References

Populated places in ancient Crete
Former populated places in Greece